Michael Lloyd may refer to:

Michael Lloyd (music producer) (born 1948), American record producer, musician, songwriter and music supervisor
Michael Lloyd (RAF officer), Royal Air Force officer
Michael Lloyd (priest) (born 1957), British Church of England priest and academic
Michael Lloyd (special effects artist), special effects artist
Michael Lloyd, jockey in the 1970 Grand National

See also
Michael Lloyd Ferrar (1876–1971), British officer of the Indian Civil Service